Peter Lee Lawrence born Karl Hyrenbach (21 February 1944 in Lindau, Germany – 20 April 1974 in Rome, Italy), was a German actor and a citizen of France. He enjoyed brief fame as a prolific leading man of Spaghetti Westerns before dying at the age of 30.

Biography

He lived in Nice for several years with his mother and then in Rome (Italy) with his wife and son. He was also cast in photonovels under the name Pierre Clément.

His first notable film role was a small, uncredited, but important appearance as the brother-in-law of Lee Van Cleef in For a Few Dollars More. From then on he went on to star in 16 more Spaghetti Westerns from 1967 to 1973. He was also credited in several of these films as Arthur Grant. Some of these films were hits in Europe including Killer Caliber .32 (1967), Day of Violence (1967), Fury of Johnny Kid (1967), The Man Who Killed Billy the Kid (1967), Killer Adios (1968). He was a particularly popular actor in Cuba.

In 1971, Lawrence had a supporting role in Black Beauty. He continued acting until his death. He had 30 film credits in his nine-year career. His last credited appearance was Los Caballeros del Botón de Ancla (1974).

Death
He met actress Cristina Galbó during the filming of Dove si spara di più in 1967, and they married two years later on 30 July 1969, remaining married until his death.

In 1972 Lawrence began suffering from headaches. Once filming finished on Los Caballeros del Botón de Ancla, he was admitted to the Foundation Jimenez Diaz Hospital in Madrid, where he was operated on by Dr. Sixto Obrador. The surgery was a success, but the biopsy report revealed it was glioblastoma. He moved to Zurich, where, under the auspices of Professor Wolfgang Horst, he began both chemo and radium treatment.  On 25 March 1974 Lawrence was admitted to the Villa Stuart Clinic in Rome with severe stomach pains. He died on Saturday 20 April 1974, at ten past three in the morning.

Filmography
 For a Few Dollars More (1965) - Mortimer's Brother-in-Law (uncredited)
 Fury of Johnny Kid (1967) - Johnny Mounters
 El hombre que mató a Billy el Niño (1967) - William 'Billy the Kid' Bonney
 Killer Caliber .32 (1967) - Silver
 Day of Violence (1967) - Johs Lee
 Killer Adios (1968) - Jess Bryan
 Testa di sbarco per otto implacabili (1968) - Lt. Strobel
 Pistol for a Hundred Coffins (1968) - Jim Slade
 Uno a uno, sin piedad (1968) - Bill 'Chico' Grayson
 Death on High Mountain (1969) - Loring Vandervelt
 Tiempos de Chicago (1969) - Erik
 Garringo (1969) - Johnny
 La furia dei Khyber (1970) - Sergeant Cullen
 Manos torpes (1970) - Peter Cushmich
 Sabata the Killer (1970) - Peter
 More Dollars for the MacGregors (1970) - Robert McGregor / Blondie
 Black Beauty (1971) - Gervaise
 I quattro pistoleri di Santa Trinità (1971) - George
 Raise Your Hands, Dead Man, You're Under Arrest (1971) - Sando Kid
 Un dólar de recompensa (1972) - Danny Lom
 Tarzán y el arco iris (1972) - Richard
 Arizona Kid (1972) - Garringo / Arizona
 Long Arm of the Godfather (1972) - Vincenzo - 'Raffica'
 Il mio corpo con rabbia (1972) - Paolo
 Amore e morte nel giardino degli dei (1972) - Manfredi
 God in Heaven... Arizona on Earth (1972) - Garringo/Arizona
 Mia moglie, un corpo per l'amore (1973) - Marco Santi
 Giorni d'amore sul filo di una lama (1973) - Stefano Bruni
 Il bacio di una morta (1974) - Andrea Valverde
 Los caballeros del botón de ancla (1974) - Carlos Corbián (final film role)

References

External links

Spaghetti Western Database Entry

1945 births
1974 deaths
German male film actors
People from Lindau
Male Spaghetti Western actors
20th-century German male actors